Lynge Jakobsen (born 10 November 1950) is a Danish former football player and sports director of the professional football club Aalborg BK (AaB), who competes in the best Danish league the Danish Superliga. Aalborg BK won the 2007-08 season and 2013-14 with Jakobsen as sports director.

Playing career
Lynge Jakobsen played his first game for Aalborg BK on 27 May 1969, after more than 4 years he was ready to play at Aalborg BK's first team in 1973. In his playing career Lynge Jakobsen played 267 games for Aalborg BK. In 1978 Lynge Jakobsen signed a contract with Aalborg BK as the first professional player in the history of the club. Lynge Jakobsen played his last game for Aalborg BK on 29 October 1979.

Among AaB fans, he goes under the name of "Gud"(God)

Education and job career
Lynge Jakobsen received training to become a merchant with the Thorndahl company, an enterprise specializing in the sale of corn. Jakobsen, at one point, also worked as a head of a municipality department for the Aalborg Municipality, before he took up the position as sports director with Aalborg BK.

Management career
Following his playing career Lynge Jakobsen was a head coach for different minor Danish clubs around Aalborg: Aalborg Chang, Lindholm IF, Aars and Storvorde. In 1996 Lynge Jakobsen started his full-time management career, when he became sports director for Aalborg BK. Jakobsen was sports director for almost 17 years.

External links
AaB profile
National team profile

1950 births
Living people
Danish men's footballers
AaB Fodbold players
Danish football managers
Sportspeople from Aalborg
Association football midfielders
Aalborg Chang managers